Saponification is a process of converting esters into soaps and alcohols by the action of aqueous alkali (for example, aqueous sodium hydroxide solutions). Soaps are salts of fatty acids, which in turn are carboxylic acids with long carbon chains. Sodium stearate is a typical soap.

Saponification of fats 
Vegetable oils and animal fats are the traditional materials that are saponified. These greasy materials, triesters called triglycerides, are mixtures derived from diverse fatty acids. Triglycerides can be converted to soap in either a one- or a two-step process. In the traditional one-step process, the triglyceride is treated with a strong base (e.g. lye), which cleaves the ester bond, releasing fatty acid salts (soaps) and glycerol.  This process is also the main industrial method for producing glycerol. In some soap-making, the glycerol is left in the soap. If necessary, soaps may be precipitated by salting it out with sodium chloride.

Fat in a corpse converts into adipocere, often called "grave wax". This process is more common where the amount of fatty tissue is high and the agents of decomposition are absent or only minutely present.

Saponification value 

The saponification value is the amount of base required to saponify a fat sample.  Soap makers formulate their recipes with a small deficit of lye to account for the unknown deviation of saponification value between their oil batch and laboratory averages.

Mechanism of basic hydrolysis 

The hydroxide anion adds to the carbonyl group of the ester.  The immediate product is called an orthoester.

Expulsion of the alkoxide generates a carboxylic acid:

The alkoxide ion is a strong base so the proton is transferred from the carboxylic acid to the alkoxide ion, creating an alcohol:

In a classic laboratory procedure, the triglyceride trimyristin is obtained by extracting it from nutmeg with diethyl ether. Saponification to the soap sodium myristate takes place using NaOH in water. Treating the soap with hydrochloric acid gives myristic acid.

Saponification of fatty acids 
The reaction of fatty acids with base is the other main method of saponification. In this case, the reaction involves neutralization of the carboxylic acid. The neutralization method is used to produce industrial soaps such as those derived from magnesium, the transition metals, and aluminium. This method is ideal for producing soaps that are derived from a single fatty acid, which leads to soaps with predictable physical properties, as required by many engineering applications.

Applications

Hard versus soft soaps 
Depending on the nature of the alkali used in their production, soaps have distinct properties. Sodium hydroxide (NaOH) produces "hard" soaps; hard soaps can also be used in water containing Mg, Cl, and Ca salts. By contrast, potassium soaps (derived using KOH) are "soft" soaps. The fatty acid source also affects the soap's melting point. Most early hard soaps were manufactured using animal fats and KOH extracted from wood ash; these were broadly solid. However, the majority of modern soaps are manufactured from polyunsaturated triglycerides such as vegetable oils. As in the triglycerides they are formed from the salts of these acids have weaker inter-molecular forces and thus lower melting points.

Lithium soaps 
Lithium derivatives of 12-hydroxystearate and other fatty acids are important constituents of lubricating greases. In lithium-based greases, lithium carboxylates are thickeners. "Complex soaps" are also common, these being combinations of more than one acid salt, such as azelaic or acetic acid.

Fire extinguishers 
Fires involving cooking fats and oils (classified as class K (US) or F (Australia/Europe/Asia)) burn hotter than most flammable liquids, rendering a standard class B extinguisher ineffective. Such fires should be extinguished with a wet chemical extinguisher. Extinguishers of this type are designed to extinguish cooking fats and oils through saponification. The extinguishing agent rapidly converts the burning substance to a non-combustible soap.

Oil paints 

Saponification can occur in oil paintings over time, causing visible damage and deformation. Oil paints are composed of pigment molecules suspended in an oil-binding medium. Heavy metal salts are often used as pigment molecules, such as in lead white, red lead, and zinc white.  If those heavy metal salts react with free fatty acids in the oil medium, metal soaps may form in a paint layer that can then migrate outward to the painting's surface.

Saponification in oil paintings was described as early as 1912. It is believed to be widespread, having been observed in many works dating from the fifteenth through the twentieth centuries; works of different geographic origin; and works painted on various supports, such as canvas, paper, wood, and copper. Chemical analysis may reveal saponification occurring in a painting's deeper layers before any signs are visible on the surface, even in paintings centuries old.

The saponified regions may deform the painting's surface through the formation of visible lumps or protrusions that can scatter light.  These soap lumps may be prominent only on certain regions of the painting rather than throughout. In John Singer Sargent's famous Portrait of Madame X, for example, the lumps only appear on the blackest areas, which may be because of the artist's use of more medium in those areas to compensate for the tendency of black pigments to soak it up.  The process can also form chalky white deposits on a painting's surface, a deformation often described as "blooming" or "efflorescence", and may also contribute to the increased transparency of certain paint layers within an oil painting over time.

Saponification does not occur in all oil paintings and many details are unresolved. At present, retouching is the only known restoration method.

See also 
 Soap
 Saponification value

References

External links 
 Animation of the mechanism of base hydrolysis

Nucleophilic substitution reactions
Chemical processes
Soaps
Bases (chemistry)
Conservation and restoration of paintings